National road 8 - The national road, 804 km in length, running through Poland from the Czech border in Kudowa Zdrój to the border with Lithuania in Budzisko. It is the Polish section of the international route E67 and a fragment of the Via Baltica. Runs across five regions: Lower Silesia, Greater Poland, Lodz, Masovian and Podlaskie. It is the longest national road in Poland.

Major cities and towns along the route 

08